Cistus symphytifolius is a shrubby species of flowering plant in the family Cistaceae. It is endemic to the Canary Islands".

Phylogeny
Cistus symphytifolius belongs to the clade of species with purple and pink flowers (the "purple pink clade" or PPC), along with some other Canary Island endemics (Cistus asper, Cistus chinamadensis, Cistus horrens, and Cistus ocreatus).

References

Endemic flora of the Canary Islands
symphytifolius